Judge Thomas Jefferson Latham (November 22, 1831 – July 24, 1911) was an American lawyer and businessman. Growing up in rural Weakley County, Tennessee in the Antebellum South,  he became a lawyer and remained neutral during the American Civil War. In the post-bellum era, he served as the debt receiver of the City of Memphis, Tennessee and the president of the Memphis Water Company. He was an investor in land development in Tennessee and coal mining in Alabama. By the time of his death, he was a millionaire.

Early life
Thomas Jefferson Latham was born on November 22, 1831 in Washington, North Carolina. He moved to Tennessee with his parents in 1833.

Latham graduated from the Western Military Institute in Georgetown, Kentucky in 1852. While he was at the institute, James G. Blaine was one of his professors. Latham proceeded to study the law in Dresden, Tennessee. He was admitted to the bar in 1857.

Career
Latham started his career as a lawyer in the late 1850s. He was elected as a representative for Weakley County, Tennessee, siding with the Whig Party. Latham was opposed to secession, but he did not support the actions of the Union Army during the American Civil War. After the war, he was opposed to disenfranchisement.

Latham resumed his legal practice in Memphis, Tennessee from 1866 to 1868. In January 1868, he was appointed by Chief Justice Salmon P. Chase as "register of the United States district court in bankruptcy" for Memphis. In 1879, he was appointed by Judge John Baxter as debt receiver of the City of Memphis.

Latham acquired the bankrupt Memphis Water Company for US$155,000 in 1880. He served as its president until 1903. Additionally, he served as the president of the Chickasaw Land Company and the New South Coal and Mining Company of Alabama. He also served on the Boards of Directors of the South Memphis Land Company and the Memphis National Bank.

Latham served as the president of the Tennessee Industrial School, a public school for orphans and destitute children. He was appointed vice president for West Tennessee of the Tennessee Historical Society in 1903.

Personal life

Latham married Mary Helen Wooldridge in 1861. The couple resided in Memphis, Tennessee. Latham attended the Linden Street Christian Church.

Latham's wife was a member of the Daughters of the American Revolution and the United Daughters of the Confederacy. She was critical in the erection of the Nathan Bedford Forrest Monument in Memphis. Additionally, according to Francesca Morgan, an Associate Professor of History at Northeastern Illinois University, Mary Latham's leadership position within the U.D.C. gave her an opportunity to anticipate Mary Ritter Beard's feminism as she "celebrated married women's property rights, white women's admission to state universities, women's establishment of "industrial and reform schools" for girls, and their community work that resulted in public libraries, public drinking fountains for man and beast, police matrons, public parks, and clean streets"."

Death and legacy
Latham died on July 24, 1911 in Memphis, Tennessee. He was buried at the Elmwood Cemetery. By the time of his death, he was worth an estimated US$1 million.

The Memphis chapter of the United Daughters of the Confederacy was named the Mary Latham Chapter, in honor of his wife.

References

External links

1831 births
1911 deaths
People from Washington, North Carolina
People from Weakley County, Tennessee
People from Memphis, Tennessee
Tennessee lawyers
Businesspeople from Tennessee
Tennessee Whigs
19th-century American politicians
19th-century American businesspeople
19th-century American lawyers